The Mexico City Metrobús Line 5 is a bus rapid transit line in the Mexico City Metrobus. It operates between Río de los Remedios in the boroughs of Gustavo A. Madero, in Mexico City's northern limit with the municipality of Ecatepec de Morelos in the State of Mexico, to Preparatoria 1 in Xochimilco.

Line 5 has a total of 51 stations and a length of 28.5 kilometers, which runs from northeastern to eastern Mexico City.

History and construction
Construction of Line 5 started on March 26, 2013 and it was inaugurated on November 5, 2013 by Miguel Ángel Mancera, then-Head of Government of the Federal District. The service ran from Río de los Remedios to San Lázaro.

Expansion works for Line 5 started in August 2017. It was planned to extend the line until Preparatoria 1, although originally intended to be extended to Glorieta de Vaqueritos in the limits of Tlalpan and Xochimilco boroughs), in southeastern Mexico City. The first extension added 26 stations along 16 kilometers. The second extension added 4 kilometers and 7 stations to the line, serving the Coyoacán, Tlalpan, and Xochimilco boroughs.

Service description

Services
The line has three itineraries.

Río de los Remedios to San Lázaro Norte
To San Lázaro Norte
First Bus: 4:32 (Monday-Friday)
Last Bus: 21:29 (Monday-Friday)
First Bus: 4:30 (Saturday)
Last Bus: 23:40 (Saturday)
First Bus: 5:00 (Sunday)
Last Bus: 23:40 (Sunday)

To Río de los Remedios
First Bus: 4:39 (Monday-Friday)
Last Bus: 22:21 (Monday-Friday)
First Bus: 4:32 (Saturday)
Last Bus: 00:11 (Saturday)
First Bus: 5:09 (Sunday)
Last Bus: 00:11 (Sunday)

Las Bombas to San Lázaro Sur
To San Lázaro Sur
First Bus: 4:30 (Monday-Friday)
Last Bus: 21:57 (Monday-Friday)

To Las Bombas
First Bus: 4:32 (Monday-Friday)
Last Bus: 21:12 (Monday-Friday)

Río de los Remedios to Las Bombas
To Las Bombas
First Bus: 4:30 (Monday-Friday)
Last Bus: 00:07 (Monday-Friday)

To Río de los Remedios
First Bus: 4:36 (Monday-Friday)
Last Bus: 00:02 (Monday-Friday)

Line 5 services the Gustavo A. Madero, Venustiano Carranza, Iztacalco, Iztapalapa and Coyoacán, Tlalpan and Xochimilco boroughs.

Station list

{| class="wikitable"
|-
! width="160px" | Stations
! Connections
! Neighborhood(s) 
! width="100px" | Borough
! Picture
! Date opened
|-
|  Río de los Remedios
| 
| Juan González Romero, Nueva Atzacoalco
| rowspan=13| Gustavo A. Madero
| 
| rowspan=18| November 5, 2013
|-
|  314. Memorial New's Divine
|
| Del Obrero, Nueva Atzacoalco
|-
|  5 de Mayo
| 
| rowspan=2| Vasco de Quiroga, Nueva Atzacoalco
|-
|  Vasco de Quiroga
|
|-
|  El Coyol
| 
| Salvador Díaz Mirón, El Coyol
|-
|  Preparatoria 3
| 
| Constitución de la República, El Coyol
| 
|-
|  San Juan de Aragón
|
  Line 6: San Juan de Aragón station
 Line 5: Gran Canal stop
| Constitución de la República, DM Nacional
| 
|-
|  Río Guadalupe
|
| Granjas Modernas, DM Nacional
| 
|-
|  Talismán
|
 Route: 15-C
| Ampliación San Juan de Aragón, San Pedro el Chico
| 
|-
|  Victoria
|
| Aragón Inguarán, Gertrudis Sánchez
| 
|-
|  Oriente 101
|
 Line 4: Av. Eduardo Molina stop
 Routes: 11-A, 12
| Ampliación Mártires de Río Blanco, Gertrudis Sánchez
| 
|- 
|  Río Santa Coleta
|
| La Joya, Nueva Tenochitlán
| 
|-
|  Río Consulado
| 
  Line 4: Consulado station (at distance)
  Line 5: Consulado station (at distance)
  Line 5: Eduardo Molina station (at distance)
 Routes: 37, 200
 Routes: 5-A, 20-A, 20-B
| La Joya, La Malinche
| 
|-
|  Canal del Norte
| 
 Route: 20-B
| Ampliación Michoacana, 20 de Noviembre
| rowspan=9| Venustiano Carranza
| 
|-
|  Deportivo Eduardo Molina
| 
| Ampliación 20 de Noviembre, 20 de Noviembre
| 
|-
|  Mercado Morelos
| 
 Route: 18
| 20 de Noviembre, Col. Morelos
| 
|-
|  Archivo General de la Nación
| 
  Line 4: Archivo General de la Nación station
| Ampliación Penitenciaria, Penitenciaria
| 
|-
|  San Lázaro
| 
  Line 4: San Lázaro station
 San Lázaro
  Line 1: San Lázaro station
  Line B: San Lázaro station
 East Bus Terminal (TAPO)
| Del Parque, 7 de Julio
| 
|-
|  Moctezuma
| 
  Line 4: Moctezuma station (at distance)
  Line 1: Moctezuma station (at distance)
 Routes: 19-E, 19-F, 19-G, 19-H (all at distance)
| Del Parque, Jardín Balbuena
| rowspan=2|
| rowspan=26| September 7, 2020
|-
|  Venustiano Carranza
| 
 Routes: 19-F, 19-H
| Jardín Balbuena
|-
|  Avenida del Taller
|
 Route: 19-F
| 24 de Abril
| 
|-
|  Mixiuhca
| 
  Line 9: Mixiuhca station
 Line 2: Mixiuhca stop
 Route: 9-C, 9-E, 14-A
| Magdalena Mixiuhca
| rowspan=29|
|-
|  Hospital General Troncoso
| 
| Granjas México
| rowspan=5| Iztacalco
|-
|  Metro Coyuya
| 
  Line 2: Metro Coyuya station
 Coyuya
  Line 8: Coyuya station
 Route: 14-A
| Granjas México, Tlazintla, Coyuya, Barrio de los Reyes
|-
|  Recreo
|
| Tlazintla
|-
|  Oriente 116
| 
| Los Picos de Iztacalco II A
|-
|  Colegio de Bachilleres 3
| 
| INFONAVIT Iztacalco
|-
|  Canal de Apatlaco
|
| Apatlaco
| rowspan=11| Iztapalapa
|-
|  Apatlaco
| 
  Line 8: Apatlaco station
 Line 9: Metro Apatlaco stop (Sundays-only)
| Purísima Atlazolpa, Pueblo Magdalena Atlazolpa, Purísima Atlazolpa, Nueva Rosita
|-
|  Aculco
| 
  Line 8: Aculco station
| Pueblo Magdalena Atlazolpa, Pueblo Aculco, Jardines de Churubusco
|-
|  Churubusco Oriente
| 
| El Sifón
|-
|  Escuadrón 201
|
: Temporary Line 12 service
 Escuadrón 201 (unused)
<li>  Line 8: Escuadrón 201 station
<li> Route: 22-D
| rowspan=2| Escuadrón 201
|-
|  Atanasio G. Saravia
|
<li>: Temporary Line 12 service
<li> Route: 22-D
|-
|  Ermita Iztapalapa
| 
<li>: Temporary Line 12 service
<li> Route: 52-C
<li> Route: 22-D
| Progreso del Sur
|-
|  Ganaderos
|
<li>: Temporary Line 12 service
| Progreso del Sur, Minerva
|-
|  Pueblo Los Reyes
|
<li>: Temporary Line 12 service
| Valle del Sur, Pueblo Los Reyes Culhuacán
|-
|  Barrio San Antonio
|
<li>: Temporary Line 12 service
| Barrio San Antonio Culhuacán
|-
|  Calzada Taxqueña
|
<li>: Temporary Line 12 service
| Barrio Tula
|-
|  Cafetales
| 
<li>: Temporary Line 12 service
| San Francisco Culhuacán
| rowspan=8| Coyoacán
|-
|  ESIME Culhuacán
|
| CTM Culhuacán V
|-
|  Manuela Sáenz
|
| CTM Culhuacán VI
|-
|  La Vírgen
|
<li> Route: 37
| Ex Ejido de San Pedro Tepetlapa, Popular Emiliano Zapata
|-
|  Tepetlapa
|
| Alianza Popular Revolucionaria, Popular Emiliano Zapata
|-
|  Las Bombas
|
| CTM Culhuacán X, Cafetales
|-
|  Vista Hermosa
|
| Hacienda de Coyoacán, CTM Culhuacán X
| rowspan=7| May 3, 2021
|-
|  Calzada del Hueso
|
| Hacienda de Coyoacán
|-
|  Cañaverales
| 
| Granjas Coapa
| Tlalpan
|-
|  Muyuguarda
| 
| San Lorenzo la Cebada
| rowspan=4| Xochimilco
|-
|  Circuito Cuemanco
|
| rowspan=2| Barrio 18
|-
|  DIF Xochimilco
|
|-
|  Preparatoria 1
| 
<li> Routes: 47-A, 81-A, 143
| Potrero de San Bernardino
| 
|}

Operators
Line 5 has the following operators.

Corredor Integral de Transporte Eduardo Molina, SA (CITEMSA)
Red de Transporte de Pasajeros del Distrito Federal (RTP)

Incidents
A week before its opening, on September 1, 2020, a truck crashed into Hospital General Troncoso station, damaging the roof.

Notes

References

2013 establishments in Mexico
5
Bus rapid transit in Mexico